A list of films produced by the Israeli film industry in 1984.

1984 releases

Unknown premiere date

Awards

See also
1984 in Israel

References

External links
 Israeli films of 1984 at the Internet Movie Database

Lists of 1984 films by country or language
Film
1984